Integrator complex subunit 1 is a protein that in humans is encoded by the INTS1 gene.

Function

INTS1 is a subunit of the Integrator complex, which associates with the C-terminal domain of RNA polymerase II large subunit (POLR2A; MIM 180660) and mediates 3-prime end processing of small nuclear RNAs U1 (RNU1; MIM 180680) and U2 (RNU2; MIM 180690) (Baillat et al., 2005 [PubMed 16239144]).

References

Further reading